Hugo Gélin (born 4 May 1980) is a French film director, producer and screenwriter.

Life and career
Hugo Gélin was born to Xavier Gélin on May 4, 1980. His grandparents are Daniel Gélin and Danièle Delorme. His aunts and uncles are actors Maria Schneider, Manuel Gélin and Fiona Gélin. He made two brief appearances as a child actor, and later started working as an assistant director and camera operator. He directed his first short in 2001 and his first feature film in 2012.

Filmography

As an actor
Lune de miel (1985)
Tant qu'il y aura des femmes (1987)

As a director
La Vie sans secret (short film, 2001)
A l’abri des regards indiscrets (short film, 2002)
Just Like Brothers (2012)
Demain tout commence (2016)
Mon inconnue (2019)

As a producer
Comme des frères (2012)
'La Cage Dorée (2013)

As a screenwriter
La Vie sans secret (short film, 2001)
A l’abri des regards indiscrets (short film, 2002)
Just Like Brothers (2012)
'La Cage Dorée (2013)
Demain tout commence (2016)
Mon inconnue (2019)

References

External links

 

1980 births
French male screenwriters
French screenwriters
French film producers
Living people
Film directors from Paris